Oregon Route 227 was an Oregon state highway which originally ran from the city of Canyonville, Oregon to the community of Trail.  In 1985, the highway was truncated at the Douglas–Jackson county line; only the southern section remained under state control.  It was known as the Tiller–Trail Highway No. 230 (see Oregon highways and routes).

Route description
OR 227 previously began, at its western terminus, at an interchange with Interstate 5 and Oregon Route 99 in Canyonville.  It headed east from there, into the foothills of the southern Oregon Cascades, along the South Fork of the Umpqua River.  East of the town of Tiller, it diverges from the river, and heads south.  The final form of the highway began at the county line and continued southward and ended at an intersection with Oregon Route 62 in Trail.

The section from Interstate 5 to Fifth Street in Canyonville overlapped OR 99.

Major intersections

References

External links
 

227
Transportation in Jackson County, Oregon